The Big Light is a 1920 German silent film directed by Hanna Henning and starring Hermann Böttcher, Wilhelm Diegelmann, and Emil Jannings.

The art direction was by Hans Sohnle.

Cast
In alphabetical order

References

Bibliography

External links

1920 films
Films of the Weimar Republic
Films directed by Hanna Henning
German silent feature films
German black-and-white films
Silent drama films
German drama films